Leon Friedman may refer to:
 Leon Friedman (politician) (1886 – 1948), American politician
 Leon Friedman (legal scholar) (born 1933), American legal scholar